"One More Chance" is a 2009 single by British band Bloc Party. It was released on 10 August 2009.

In interviews Kele Okereke has stated that there was still some creative energy left after making Intimacy and this was the reasoning behind making "One More Chance".

The song was released in order to coincide with the band's 'Bloctober' tour.

The song received its first radio play on 18 June 2009 on Zane Lowe's BBC Radio 1 show.

The music video for the song was first released publicly on the official MTV site in July 2009.

The single debuted at 15 in the UK Singles Chart after its first week of release.

Track listing

iTunes download
 One More Chance
 One More Chance (Instrumental)
 Zephyrus (Holy Fuck Remix)

7" single
Side A
 One More Chance

Side B
 Zephyrus (Holy Fuck Remix)

12" single
Side A
 One More Chance (extended mix)
 One More Chance (Tiësto Remix)

Side B
 One More Chance (Todd Terry's Inhouse Mix)
 One More Chance (Heartbreak Remix)

Personnel

Kele Okereke - lead vocals, rhythm guitar
Russell Lissack - lead guitar
Gordon Moakes - bass, keyboards, vocal effects
Matt Tong - drum machine

Charts

References

External links
 First playing of song at BBC Radio 1
 Music Video at MTV
 

2009 singles
Bloc Party songs
Song recordings produced by Jacknife Lee
2009 songs
Wichita Recordings singles
Songs written by Kele Okereke
Songs written by Russell Lissack